Pentti Eskola (born 16 July 1938) is a Finnish athlete. He competed in the men's long jump at the 1964 Summer Olympics.

References

External links
 

1938 births
Living people
Athletes (track and field) at the 1964 Summer Olympics
Finnish male long jumpers
Olympic athletes of Finland
Place of birth missing (living people)